The Warsaw Ballroom, or more commonly referred to simply as "Warsaw" was a gay night club located in South Beach, Florida, United States, at Collins Avenue and Espanola Way.  Prior to becoming Warsaw it was known by many other names including "Ovo" and "China Club".

In 1989 Andrew Delaplaine took over the lease on what had been the China Club and renamed the club the "Warsaw Ballroom".

In 1989 David Padilla was offered the resident DJ spot at the reincarnated Ovo, which would soon become (Warsaw Ballroom).

Final days

Buildings and structures in Miami Beach, Florida
Defunct LGBT nightclubs in the United States